Ruby jewel may refer to:

 Jewel bearing
 Chlorocypha consueta, the African damselfly